Simon James Greenhill is a New Zealand scientist who works on the application of quantitative methods to the study of cultural evolution and human prehistory. He is well known for creating and building various linguistics databases, including the Austronesian Basic Vocabulary Database, TransNewGuinea.org, Pulotu, and many others. In addition to Austronesian, he has contributed to the study of the phylogeny of many language families, including Dravidian and Sino-Tibetan.

He is a graduate of University of Auckland, New Zealand. The title of his 2008 doctoral thesis is The archives of history : a phylogenetic approach to the study of language.

Greenhill is currently a scientist affiliated with the Australian National University in Canberra, Australia, and the Max Planck Institute for the Science of Human History in Jena, Germany.

References

External links

Austronesian Basic Vocabulary Database
Trans-New Guinea Online
POLLEX: Polynesian Lexicon Project Online
Pulotu, Database of Pacific Religions
Database of Places, Language, Culture and Environment (D-PLACE)

Profiles
Australian National University
Google Scholar
ResearchGate

Computational linguistics researchers
Linguists of Austronesian languages
University of Auckland alumni
Academic staff of the Australian National University
Living people
Year of birth missing (living people)
Max Planck Institute for the Science of Human History
Phylogenetics researchers